Ian Hamilton (born 21 July 1956) is an English former professional footballer who played as a midfielder in the Football League for Darlington and in the Belgian First Division for Liège.

Life and career
Hamilton was born in South Shields, County Durham. He began his professional football career with Football League Fourth Division club Darlington, joining from Boldon Colliery Welfare in 1979. Over three seasons, he scored 19 goals from 103 appearances in league matches, and then moved to Belgium where he was to settle.

He spent a season in the Second Division with La Louvière before moving up to the First with Liège. In his second season with Liège, Hamilton helped the club qualify for the UEFA Cup, but made what he later described as his greatest mistake by walking out because they refused him a pay rise. He returned to La Louvière, where he spent five years playing in the third tier, leaving after the club and several of its players, Hamilton included, were fined for financial irregularities. He dropped down another division with Binche, a club he later managed.

, he was working as a pallet controller and watching matches in Belgium, France and the Netherlands on behalf of his brother David who was then Wigan Athletic's chief scout.

References

1956 births
Living people
Footballers from South Shields
English footballers
Association football midfielders
Darlington F.C. players
R.A.A. Louviéroise players
RFC Liège players
English Football League players
Belgian Pro League players
English football managers